The 2020 Southern Conference men's soccer tournament was the 33rd edition of the Southern Conference Men's Soccer Tournament. The tournament determined the Southern Conference champion as well as the conference's automatic berth into the 2020 NCAA Division I men's soccer tournament.

Effects of the Covie-19 pandemic 

The tournament was originally set to be played in November 2020, however, the Southern Conference postponed all fall sports with the hope to play in the spring.

Format 
Contrary to previous tournaments, the 2020 edition was only contested by the top four teams in the conference.

Qualified teams

Bracket

Matches

Semifinals

Final

References 

2020 Southern Conference men's soccer season
Southern Conference Men's Soccer Tournament
2020 in sports in North Carolina
2020 in sports in South Carolina